Chase Robert Silseth (born May 18, 2000) is an American professional baseball pitcher for the Los Angeles Angels of Major League Baseball (MLB).

Silseth was born and raised in Farmington, New Mexico, where he played baseball for Piedra Vista High School. He played college baseball at the University of Tennessee, College of Southern Nevada, and the University of Arizona. Silseth was selected in the 11th round of the 2021 Major League Baseball draft by the Angels and signed with the team, forgoing his senior year of college. He made his MLB debut on May 13, 2022, becoming the first player in the 2021 draft class to reach the major leagues.

Amateur career
Silseth grew up in Farmington, New Mexico and attended Piedra Vista High School. As a junior, he pitched to a 8–2 record with a 0.56 ERA and 116 strikeouts. Silseth committed to play college baseball at Tennessee in November of his senior year. He was named the New Mexico Gatorade Player of the Year in his senior season after he went 7–3 with a 1.25 ERA and 53 strikeouts in 56 innings pitched and also batted .328.

Silseth began his college baseball career at Tennessee. He went 1–1 with a 4.35 ERA in 18 appearances as a freshman. Silseth transferred to the College of Southern Nevada after his freshman year and played one season before transferring to the University of Arizona. In his lone season with the Wildcats, he posted a 8–1 record with a 5.55 ERA and 105 strikeouts in 18 starts.

Professional career
Silseth was selected in the 11th round by the Los Angeles Angels in the 2021 Major League Baseball draft. After signing with the team he was assigned to the Arizona Complex League Angels before being promoted to the Double-A Rocket City Trash Pandas. Silseth returned to the Trash Pandas to start the 2022 season and was named the Southern League Pitcher of the Month for April. After the season, he was chosen for the Southern League Pitcher of the Year Award.

On May 13, 2022, the Angels selected Silseth's contract and promoted him to the active roster. He made his major league debut that night against the Oakland Athletics, pitching six scoreless innings while striking out four batters. Silseth became the first player from the 2021 MLB draft to debut in MLB.

References

External links

Tennessee Volunteers bio
Arizona Wildcats bio

2000 births
Living people
People from Farmington, New Mexico
Baseball players from New Mexico
Major League Baseball pitchers
Los Angeles Angels players
Tennessee Volunteers baseball players
Southern Nevada Coyotes baseball players
Arizona Wildcats baseball players
Arizona Complex League Angels players
Rocket City Trash Pandas players